Greatest Hits, Vol. 1 is a compilation album by country singer Johnny Cash, released in 1967 (see 1967 in music) on Columbia Records. It is notable in that it marks the first appearance of "Jackson", Cash's famous duet with his future wife, June Carter. The track would appear on Carryin' On with Johnny Cash and June Carter in August of that same year. The album was certified Gold on 7/24/1969 and Platinum and 2× Platinum on 11/21/1986 by the RIAA.

Track listing

Charts 
Album – Billboard (United States)

Singles – Billboard (United States)

External links 
 Luma Electronic entry on Greatest Hits, Vol. 1

1967 greatest hits albums
Johnny Cash compilation albums
Columbia Records compilation albums